Gyeonghui Palace (in Korean: Gyeonghuigung, literally Palace of Serene Harmony) is a palace located in Seoul, South Korea. It was one of the "Five Grand Palaces" built by the Joseon Dynasty.

History

Construction began in the 1600s during the reign of King Gwanghaegun.  In the latter Joseon period, Gyeonghuigung served as the secondary palace for the king, and as it was situated on the west side of Seoul, it was also called Seo-gwol (西闕, a palace of the west). The secondary palace is usually the palace where the King moves to in times of emergency.  

From King Injo to King Cheoljong, about ten kings of Joseon dynasty stayed here at Gyeonghuigung. This palace was built using the slanted geography of the surrounding mountain, has traditional beauty in its architecture and a lot of historical significance. For a time, it was of a considerable size, even to the point of having an arched bridge connecting it to Deoksugung palace. For the king's royal audience, there were the Sungjeongjeon and Jajeongjeon buildings, and for sleeping, Yungbokjeon and Hoesangjeon buildings.  

Most of Gyeonghuigung was lost to two fires that broke out in the 19th century, during the reigns of King Sunjo and King Gojong. The Japanese dismantled what remained of the palace during their occupation of the Korean peninsula, and a school for Japanese citizens was built on the site. Two major structures of the former palace — the Sungjeongjeon throne hall and the Heunghwamun gate — were disassembled and moved to other parts of Seoul. Reconstruction started in the 1990s as part of the South Korean government's initiative to rebuild the "Five Grand Palaces" that were heavily destroyed by the Japanese. However, due to urban growth and decades of neglect, the government was only able to reconstruct around 33% of the former Palace.

Architecture

Heunghwamun
Heunghwamun is the main entrance door to the palace.
The entrance was built in 1616, but it was briefly moved to be a entrance for the  after the destruction of the palace, and later used as a main entrance for the Silla Hotel of Jangchung-dong until it was finally restored to its original purpose. Heunghwamun is designated as Municipal Treasure 19.

Geuncheongyo
Geuncheongyo is a bridge at the route passed through the Heunghwamun. It was built in 1619, but was buried into soil during Japanese rule until it was restored in 2001.

Sungjeongjeon
Sungjeongjeon is the main hall of the palace. It was built in 1616 but was moved to Dongguk University in 1926 and repurposed as a buddhist temple in Japanese colonial times, and moved back to original location and renovated between 1988–1994. Its considered an example of mid-joseon period architecture. Sungjeongjeon is designated as Municipal Treasure 20.

Jajeongjeon

Taenyeongjeon
Taenyeongjeon is a hall restored following depictions in Seogwoldoan.

Present use
It is Historic Site No. 271.

In the palace grounds today are the Seoul Museum of History and The Seoul Museum annex of art. It also housed Prada's Transformer in 2009.

See also
List of palaces
Korean architecture
History of Korea

References

External links

Official guide from Cultural Heritage Administration
Visit Seoul information
Seoul Museum of Art
 The Seoul Guide : Gyeonghuigung Palace

Jongno District
Palaces in South Korea
Royal residences in South Korea
Buildings and structures in Seoul
History of Seoul
Tourist attractions in Seoul